Benmore Dam is the largest dam within the Waitaki power scheme, located in the Canterbury Region of New Zealand's South Island.  There are eight other power stations in the Waitaki Power Scheme.

The dam is the largest earth-fill (zoned embankment dam) water-retaining structure in New Zealand. Its core is low permeability clay material, supported by two massive shoulders of river gravel. Lake Benmore has a volume of 1.25 billion cubic metres, about 1.5 times as much water as Wellington Harbour.  The dam's spillway can cope with over 6,000 cubic metres of water per second, about 20 times the mean river flow.

Benmore Power Station

The $62 million construction of the dam and hydroelectric station began in 1958. It was commissioned in 1965, and officially opened by Prime Minister Sir Keith Holyoake on 15 May that year. It was built for the New Zealand Electricity Department; since 1999 it has been owned and operated by Meridian Energy.

From 2008 to 2010 the six turbines are being refurbished at a cost of $67 million. New switchboards and an upgrade to the switchyard are also planned.

Benmore is the South Island terminus of the HVDC Inter-Island link between the North and South Islands of New Zealand. The HVDC converter stations are on the west side of the tailrace, and convert 220 kV AC power to ±350 kV DC for the  journey to the North Island converter station at the Haywards in Lower Hutt.

Otematata 
Otematata is the small town that was created to support workers who constructed the dam, and their families. The town was constructed by the Ministry of Works, which residents called "Uncle Mow" or "Big Mow" as it provides every feature, including social activities and clubs, and expelled criminals from the town. After the dam was constructed, much of the village was dismantled. Many of the houses, which had been trucked in from Roxborough, were trucked away again and moved to the next site in Twizel.

Today Otematata supports the dam, although with advances in technology the staffing needed to maintain the dam is drastically smaller.  Due to this the town is now a small holiday community, with only around 200 permanent residents. The dam is about  up the valley from the township.

Key statistics
 Lake Benmore area: ~ 75 square kilometres
 Lake Benmore shoreline: 116 km
 Dam crest length: 823 metres
 Dam crest height: 100 metres
 Dam width at base: 490 metres
 Dam width at crest: 10.6 metres
 Dam fill: 28 million tonnes
 Head (hydraulic): 92 metres
 Average river water flow: 340 m³/s
 Nominal annual generation: 2,200 GWh
 Installed capacity: 540 MW 
 Machinery: 6 x 90,000 kW vertical Francis turbines (Dominion Engineering, Canada), coupled to 6 x 90,000 kW 112,500 kVA generators (Canadian General Electric); 3 transformers totalling 1,150 MVA
 Penstocks: Prestressed concrete

Transmission

Benmore is a major switching point in the New Zealand national grid and one of two major switching stations in the Waitaki Valley (the other being Twizel sub-station). The importance is largely due to the location at Benmore of the southern terminal station of the HVDC Inter-Island link.

The main AC switching station is on the east bank of the tailrace, and electricity generated at Benmore Power Station is injected into the national grid here. Three major 220 kV lines containing five circuits run from the Benmore substation. Clockwise from south, they are:
 A double-circuit line to the Twizel sub-station, with one circuit going via Ohau C power station and one circuit going via Ohau B power station.
 A single-circuit line to Islington sub-station in Christchurch, via Twizel sub-station and Tekapo B power station.
 A double-circuit line to Aviemore Dam

The HVDC converter stations are located on the west side of the tailrace, connected to the AC switching station by lines over the tailrace. The -350 kV thyristor Pole 2 has its valve hall on the south side of the site. A new +350 kV thyristor Pole 3 was commissioned in 2013 to replace the ageing Pole 1, and its valve hall is located adjacent to the existing Pole 2 valve hall.

See also

National Grid (New Zealand)
List of power stations in New Zealand
Electricity sector in New Zealand
New Zealand electricity market

References

Further reading

 
 
Power for the People (2015) Spectrum for RNZ. 24 minutes. Available at RNZ.

External links
Meridian Energy - power station information
 

Dams completed in 1965
Buildings and structures in Canterbury, New Zealand
Dams in New Zealand
Earth-filled dams